= Kayus =

Iranian prince

Kayus or Kâvos was the name of an Iranian prince who ruled the Kâvusakân Dynasty (House of Kayus) in 226. Kayus was reinstated king of present-day northern Iraq and western Iran following a two-year war between an array of united kingdoms and the Sasanian Empire. Kayus was known as King of the Kardouchoian and ruled as an autonomous tributary king in his capital Kermanshah. The kingdom he established would rule until 380.

== Sources ==
- Afshar, Iraj, Kermanshahan and Its Ancient Civilization. Tehran, 1992.
